The 1975–76 NBA season was the Bullets 15th season in the NBA and their 3rd season in the city of Washington, D.C.

Draft picks

Roster

Regular season

Season standings

Notes
 z, y – division champions
 x – clinched playoff spot

Record vs. opponents

Game log

Regular season

Playoffs

|- align="center" bgcolor="#ccffcc"
| 1
| April 13
| @ Cleveland
| W 100–95
| Elvin Hayes (28)
| Elvin Hayes (18)
| Dave Bing (5)
| Richfield Coliseum19,974
| 1–0
|- align="center" bgcolor="#ffcccc"
| 2
| April 15
| Cleveland
| L 79–80
| Phil Chenier (19)
| Unseld, Robinson (13)
| Dave Bing (7)
| Capital Centre17,988
| 1–1
|- align="center" bgcolor="#ffcccc"
| 3
| April 17
| @ Cleveland
| L 76–88
| Elvin Hayes (17)
| Wes Unseld (13)
| four players tied (3)
| Richfield Coliseum21,061
| 1–2
|- align="center" bgcolor="#ccffcc"
| 4
| April 21
| Cleveland
| W 109–98
| Clem Haskins (22)
| Unseld, Hayes (14)
| Wes Unseld (7)
| Capital Centre17,542
| 2–2
|- align="center" bgcolor="#ffcccc"
| 5
| April 22
| @ Cleveland
| L 91–92
| Elvin Hayes (25)
| Elvin Hayes (13)
| Dave Bing (6)
| Richfield Coliseum21,312
| 2–3
|- align="center" bgcolor="#ccffcc"
| 6
| April 25
| Cleveland
| W 102–98 (OT)
| Elvin Hayes (28)
| Wes Unseld (18)
| Wes Unseld (8)
| Capital Centre19,035
| 3–3
|- align="center" bgcolor="#ffcccc"
| 7
| April 29
| @ Cleveland
| L 85–87
| Phil Chenier (31)
| Elvin Hayes (11)
| Wes Unseld (4)
| Richfield Coliseum21,564
| 3–4
|-

Playoffs

East First Round
The Bullets' had a first round bye.

East Conference semifinals

(2) Cleveland Cavaliers vs. (3) Washington Bullets: Cavaliers win series 4-3
 Game 1 @ Cleveland: Washington 100, Cleveland 95
 Game 2 @ Washington: Cleveland 80, Washington 79
 Game 3 @ Cleveland: Cleveland 88, Washington 76
 Game 4 @ Washington: Washington 109, Cleveland 98
 Game 5 @ Cleveland: Cleveland 92, Washington 91
 Game 6 @ Washington: Washington 102, Cleveland 98 (OT)
 Game 7 @ Cleveland: Cleveland 87, Washington 85

Awards and records
 Elvin Hayes, All-NBA Second Team

References

Washington Wizards seasons
Washington
Wash
Wash